Trimethylsilylpropanoic acid (TMSP or TSP) is a chemical compound containing a trimethylsilyl group. It is used as internal reference in the NMR spectrum nuclear magnetic resonance for aqueous solvents (e.g. D2O). For that use it is often deuterated (3-(trimethylsilyl)-2,2,3,3-tetradeuteropropionic acid or TMSP-d4). Other internal references that are frequently used in NMR experiments are DSS and tetramethylsilane.

References

Propionic acids
Trimethylsilyl compounds
Nuclear magnetic resonance